Panchagarh ('five forts') is a district of the Rangpur division in Northern Bangladesh. Panchagarh is the northernmost district of Bangladesh. It lies between 26º00' and 26º38' north latitudes and between 88º19' and 88º49' east longitudes. It was established as a district on 1 February 1984.

Etymology

Panchagarh is also called pachagarh (which means 'rotten' in bengali) as a mockery term.  There are two main beliefs associated with the name of the district. The first is that Panchargarh was named after an area called Pancha Nagari in the kingdom of Pundu Nagar. The second is that it was named for the five forts (or ) in the region. The forts were Bhitargarh, Hosaingarh, Mirgarh, Rajangarh and Devengarh, hence the name Panchagarh, meaning 'five forts'.

History
During the regime of the British Raj, Panchagarh was part of the Jalpaiguri district of undivided Bengal. In 1911, Jalpaiguri was fully established as a thana. At that time, the headquarters of Jalpaiguri  was situated in Jagdal upazila of the current Panchagarh district. The  was relocated at the bank of Karatoya River in its current position for environmental and transportation benefits. After the Partition of India and Pakistan in 1947, Panchagarh was a  under the Thakurgaon . On 1 January 1980, it was established as a  consisting of five s named Tetulia, Panchagarh Sadar, Atwari, Boda and Debiganj. The first commissioner of Panchagarh was Sayed Abdur Rashid from 1 January 1980 to 31 December 1982. Later, it was established as a district on 1 February 1984. The first deputy commissioner of Panchagarh was A. S. M. Abdul Halim from 1 February 1984 to 16 June 1985.

Geography

Geographically this land is lower basin of the Himalayas so comparatively this land is most highland in bangladesh. It lies between 26º00' and 26º38' north latitudes and between 88º19' and 88º49' east longitudes.

Total area of the district is 1,404.62 km2. The district consists of five , 43 unions, 420 , 825 villages, two , 18 wards and 64 . Its soil is sandy, alluvial and bears close affinity with the soil of the old Himalayan basin. On the northern part of the district there exists an underground layer of pebbles. Panchagarh has 16 rivers. Among them some main rivers are Karatoya (Karatoa), Atrai, Teesta, Nagor, Mahananda, Tangon, Dahuk, Pathraj, Bhulli, Talma, Chawai, Kurum, Tirnoi, and Chilka. The border of this district was designed by Sir Cyril John Radcliffe in 1947.

Demographics 

According to the 2022 Bangladesh census, Panchagarh District had a population of 1,179,843, of which 588,888 were males and 590,750 females. Rural population was 989,870 (83.91%) while the urban population was 189,811 (16.09%). Panchagarh district had a literacy rate of 73.59% for the population 7 years and above: 76.59% for males and 70.62% for females.

Muslims make up 84.04% of the population while Hindus are 15.67% of the population.

Economy

The local industry consists of tea, sugar, rice mills, ice factories, garment factories, oil milling, and saw milling.

The place is of international character and used for Nepal transit traffic passing through a small corridor of India.

Panchagarh is famous for its tea industry which plays a major role in the economics of this area. Of them nearly 2,300 workers, mostly women, work alone at the giant Kazi & Kazi Tea Estate (KKTE) at Tetulia which has earned a reputation in both national and international markets by producing, processing and marketing Kazi & Kazi organic tea, also sold as Teatulia Organic Teas, and earning foreign exchange.

Industry for manufacturing SPC electric poles, established a plant (Gemcon Ltd.) on 35 acres in Panchagarh District. Here, all the products in the plant are manufactured by using indigenous raw materials. The factory has created direct or indirect job opportunities for more than 1500 people and helping the nation to alleviate poverty.

Gem Jute Limited was established in Panchagarh in 2003, with a corporate vision of improving the livelihood of the local population by providing employment and advancement opportunities as well as stimulating the local economy through direct and indirect economic activities. Gem Jute promotes sustainable development and support the environment by providing high-quality, organic, biodegradable products to the world market. Over 5000 people work at Gem Jute Limited.

Under Bangladesh Sugar and Food Industries Corporation (BSFIC), Panchagarh Sugar Mills Ltd. is the oldest industry in the district. Panchagarh Sugar Mills was set up by the government in 1965–69 at a cost of Tk.55.55 million. It is near the district headquarters of Panchagarh and is the northernmost sugar mill in Bangladesh. Machinery and equipment of the sugar mill were supplied by M/S. Stork Werkspoor of Holland. The sugar mill started its trial production in 1969–70. Since the independence of Bangladesh (until 2005), the sugar mill has produced 8,536 million tons of sugar per annum on average with an average sugar recovery rate of 8.10% from sugarcane.

Points of interest

Atwari

Atwari, a popular tourist spot, has three domed mosques at Mirzapur, Chhaprajhar (Pahar Bhanga) and Sardarpara, which bear the relics of Mughal architecture and the remains of the Zamindar Bari of Aloakhoa. The Bara Awliyar Majar is another notable place of interest.

Atwari has the marks of Bangladesh War of Liberation of 1971. There are 2 mass graves, 1 twin grave and 1 martyr memorial monument.

Panchagarh Sadar

Maharaja Dighi (Pond) at Bhitargarh is a well-known tourist attraction in the Sadar Upazila. Bhitrar Shalmara is a notable lake. Shal forest of Bhitargarh and the government forest on the banks of the Chawai and Karatôya rivers are also quite famous.

During the War of Liberation in 1971, the guerrilla fighters demolished the bridge on the Chawai near the Amarkhana camp thereby obstructing the advance of the Pakistani army towards the north. In the initial stage of the war, Maqbul Darji and the Badi Howladar (EPR) were killed in an encounter with the Pakistani army, which lost eighteen of its soldiers.

The Shaheed Farooque Ahmad Memorial Monument at Dhakka-mara in Panchagarh town, as well as the grave of the martyr freedom fighter Sakimuddin at Jagdal-hat in front of the Baital Aman mosque, mark the War of Liberation.

Boda

The Vadeswari mosque, Vadeswari temple and Govinda temple are famous tourist attractions in Boda.

Debiganj
In Debiganj, the Revenue office building and the old residential house of the Raja of Cooch-Bihar are quite well-known. Jagabandhu Thakur-bari is another place of interest for tourists. Saldanga Gokulam Temple, which is notable for its Greek architecture, is located in Debiganj. The town has one dak bungalow (rest house).

Administration

Panchagarh has five upazilas: 

 Administrator of Zila Porishod: Abu Bakar Siddique
 Deputy Commissioner (DC): Md. Jahurul Islam

Members of tenth Jatiyo Sangsad
The members of the tenth Jatiyo Sangsad, elected in 2019, are:

Panchagarh-1: Mozaharul Haque Prodhan (from Awami League)
Panchagarh-2: Nurul Islam Sujon (from Awami League)

Transport
Bicycle, rickshaw, and motorcycle are the main modes of transport for local people. Regular buses connect the district to neighbouring districts and subdivisions. Road transportation between Dhaka and Panchagarh is a private sector affair, operating predominantly in domestic routes. On 10 November 2018, direct train service from Dhaka to Panchagarh was inaugurated. There is no direct air connection from Dhaka to Panchagarh.

Education
The district's literacy rate is 51.08%, among which male and female literacy rates are 55.02% and 48.03% respectively.  There are 313 primary schools, 65 kindergartens, 79 NGO schools, four government secondary schools, 268 non-government secondary schools, two government colleges, 25 non-government colleges, 94 madrasas, and 13 technical and vocational institutions in the district.

Notable schools and colleges of the districts are:

 B.P (Bishnu Prasad) Government High School
 Panchagarh Government Girls' High School
 M.R (Moqbular Rahman) Government College
 Panchagarh Government Women's College

Tourist spots 
Notable places of the district are:

 Bhitarganj
 Maharajar Dighi
 Badeshwari Mahapith Temple
 Mirjapur Shahi Mosque
 Golok Dham Temple
 Banglabandha zero point and land port
 Tetulia dak bungalow
 Rocks Museum

Notable residents
 Muhammad Jamiruddin Sarkar, former speaker, Jatiyo Sangshad
 Mirza Ghulam Hafiz, former Minister of Law and Justice, Jatiyo Sangshad
Sirajul Islam, Member of Parliament, Jatiyo Sangshad
Mohammad Sultan, language movement activist in 1952
 Mohammad Farhad, Captain of Guerilla force in the 1971 independence war and member of the parliament of national parliament
 Abdur Rahman, film actor
Shoriful Islam, Bangladeshi cricketer
Md. Nurul Islam Sujon, Railway Minister of Bangladesh

See also
Districts of Bangladesh
Rangpur Division

Notes

References

External links

 বাংলাপিডিয়া, মির্জা গোলাম হাফিজ
 জেলা তথ্য বাতায়ন, পঞ্চগড়।

 
Districts of Bangladesh